The name Mami Wata and its variants may refer to:

Mami Wata, water deities of the African diaspora
L'Expression de Mamy-Wata, a satire newspaper printed in Cameroon
Mami Wata, 2023 film